Sinapaldehyde is an organic compound with the formula HO(CH3O)2C6H2CH=CHCHO.  It is a derivative of cinnamaldehyde, featuring one hydroxy group and two methoxy groups as substituents. It is an intermediate in the formation of sinapyl alcohol, a lignol that is a major precursor to lignin.

Biosynthetic role
In sweetgum (Liquidambar styraciflua), sinapaldehyde arises in two steps from coniferyl aldehyde beginning with hydroxylation mediated by coniferyl aldehyde 5-hydroxylase.  The diphenol is then methylated at the 5-OH by the action of caffeate O-methyltransferase.

Sinapaldehyde is reduced to the alcohol by the action of dehydrogenase enzymes. In Arabidopsis thaliana, the enzyme dihydroflavonol 4-reductase uses NADP+ to reduce sinapaldehyde to sinapyl alcohol.

It is found in Senra incana (Hibisceae). It is a low molecular weight phenol that is susceptible to extraction from cork stoppers into wine.

See also 

Phenolic content in wine
Syringaldehyde
Syringol
Syringic acid
Acetosyringone
Sinapinic acid
Sinapine
Canolol

References 

Natural phenols
Aldehydes
O-methylated phenylpropanoids